David Garnett (9 March 1892 – 17 February 1981) was an English writer and publisher. As a child, he had a cloak made of rabbit skin and thus received the nickname "Bunny", by which he was known to friends and intimates all his life.

Early life
Garnett was born in Brighton, East Sussex, the only child of writer, critic and publisher Edward Garnett and his wife Constance Clara Black, a translator of Russian. His paternal grandfather and great-grandfather both worked at what is now the British Library, then within the British Museum.

Encouraged by his father, he gained his first paid work at the age of eleven, drawing a map entitled "NEW SEA and the BEVIS COUNTRY", signed "D. G. fecit", to illustrate a new edition of Bevis, a boy's adventure story by Richard Jefferies. For this he received five shillings from the publisher Gerald Duckworth, for whom his father was a reader. He was then sent as a day boy to a prep school called Westerham, five miles from the Cearne, being expected to travel there daily on a scaled-down version of a Penny-farthing bicycle which had been owned by his uncle Arthur Garnett as a boy, wearing a beret. As a result of this, the other boys gave him the name "Onions".

In 1905, Garnett’s mother moved into a rented flat in Hampstead, from where he began to attend University College School in Gower Street, London, travelling there daily by horse-drawn tram.

In his time between school and university, Garnett befriended Vinayak Damodar Savarkar, then in Brixton Prison, and devised an unsuccessful attempt to spring him from the gaol. He spent July and August of 1910 in Germany, to learn the language, and then in October was admitted to the Royal College of Science in South Kensington, a department of Imperial College, London, to study zoology and botany, where he was taught by J. B. Farmer, Adam Sedgwick, and Clifford Dobell.

As a conscientious objector in the First World War, Garnett worked on fruit farms in Suffolk and Sussex with his lover Duncan Grant.

Work
Needing money, in 1919 Garnett wrote a sensational novel called Dope Darling : A Story of Cocaine, set during the First World War, which tells the story of an affair between a young medical student and a night-club singer and drug addict called Claire Plowman. According to a biographer of Garnett, Claire bore a striking resemblance to Betty May, with a nod to Lilian Shelley. For this, he used the pen name of Leda Burke.

A prominent member of the Bloomsbury Group, Garnett received literary recognition when his novel Lady into Fox, an allegorical fantasy, was awarded the 1922 James Tait Black Memorial Prize for fiction. He ran a bookshop near the British Museum with Francis Birrell during the 1920s. He also founded (with Francis Meynell) the Nonesuch Press.  He wrote the novel Aspects of Love (1955), on which the later Andrew Lloyd Webber musical of the same name would be based.

Garnett published a memoir, The Golden Echo in 1953. Subsequently, he wrote two further volumes under the title The Golden Echo with subtitles The Flowers of the Forest (1955), and The Familiar Faces (1962). In this memoir, Garnett described the English literary circles he moved among, including the Bloomsbury group.

Personal life

His first wife was the illustrator Rachel "Ray" Marshall (1891–1940), sister of the translator and diarist Frances Partridge. He and Ray, whose woodcuts appear in some of Garnett's books, had two sons, the older of whom was Richard Garnett (1923–2013), the writer. Ray died relatively young of breast cancer.

Garnett was bisexual, as were several members of the artistic and literary Bloomsbury Group, and he had affairs with Francis Birrell and Duncan Grant. On 25 December 1918 he was present at the birth of Grant's daughter by Vanessa Bell,  Angelica, who was accepted by Vanessa's husband Clive Bell. Shortly afterwards he wrote to a friend: "I think of marrying it. When she is 20, I shall be 46 – will it be scandalous?" On 8 May 1942, when Angelica was in her early twenties, they did marry, to the horror of her parents. She did not find out until much later that her husband had been a lover of her father.

The Garnetts lived at Hilton Hall, near St Ives in Huntingdonshire, where David Garnett had a farm with a herd of Jersey cows, an orchard, a swimming pool, sculptures, and a dovehouse. 

They had four daughters: in order, Amaryllis, Henrietta, and the twins Nerissa and Frances; eventually the couple separated. Amaryllis was an actress who had a small part in Harold Pinter's film adaptation of The Go-Between (1970). She drowned in the Thames, aged 29. Henrietta (1945—2019) married Lytton Burgo Partridge, the nephew of her father's first wife Ray, but was left a widow with a newborn infant when she was 18; she oversaw the legacies of both David Garnett and Duncan Grant.  Nerissa Garnett (1946–2004) was an artist, ceramicist, and photographer. Fanny (Frances) Garnett moved to France where she became a farmer.

Later life

After his separation from Angelica, Garnett moved to France and lived in the grounds at the Château de Charry, Montcuq (near Cahors), in a house leased to him by the owners, Jo and Angela d'Urville. Garnett continued to write and lived there until his death in 1981.

List of selected publications 

Dope Darling (1919), novel, as Leda Burke
Lady into Fox (1922), novel
A Man in the Zoo (1924), novel
The Sailor's Return (1925), novel
Go She Must! (1927), novel
The Old Dove Cote (1928), short stories
A Voyage to the Island of the Articoles by André Maurois (1928), translator
Never Be a Bookseller (1929), memoirs
No Love (1929), novel
The Grasshoppers Come (1931)
A Terrible Day (1932)
A Rabbit in the Air. Notes from a diary kept while learning to handle an aeroplane (1932)
Pocahontas (1933)
Letters from John Galsworthy 1900–1932 (1934)
Beany-Eye (1935)
The Letters of T. E. Lawrence (1938), editor
The Battle of Britain (1941)
War in the Air (1941)
The Campaign in Greece and Crete (1942)
The Novels of Thomas Love Peacock (1948), editor
Selected Letters of T. E. Lawrence (1952), editor
Aspects of Love (1955)
A Shot in the Dark (1958)
A Net for Venus (1959) novel
Two by Two (1963), novel
338171 T. E. (Lawrence of Arabia) by Victoria Ocampo (1963), translator
Ulterior Motives (1966) novel
The White/Garnett Letters (1968), correspondence with T. H. White
Carrington: Letters & Extracts From Her Diaries (1970)
First "Hippy" Revolution (1970)
A Clean Slate (1971)
The Sons of the Falcon (1972), novel
Purl and Plain (1973) stories
Plough Over the Bones (1973), novel
The Master Cat (1974)
Up She Rises (1977)
  
David Garnett. C.B.E. A Writer's Library (1983)
Sylvia & David. The Townsend Warner / Garnett Letters (1994), correspondence with Sylvia Townsend Warner
The Secret History of PWE : The Political Warfare Executive, 1939–1945 (2002)

Autobiography

References

Bibliography 

 

 
Heilbrun, Carolyn G., The Garnett Family (1961), also on Richard Garnett, Jeremiah Garnett, Edward Garnett, Constance Garnett.

External links

 
 
 
 

1892 births
1981 deaths
20th-century English novelists
20th-century British short story writers
20th-century English male writers
Bisexual men
Bloomsbury Group
British conscientious objectors
English non-fiction writers
English fantasy writers
English LGBT novelists
English male short story writers
English short story writers
English male novelists
English male non-fiction writers
David
James Tait Black Memorial Prize recipients
People educated at University College School
People from Brighton
Private press movement people
20th-century English LGBT people